Meteuthria is a genus of sea snails, marine gastropod mollusks in the family Buccinidae, the true whelks.

Species
Species within the genus Meteuthria include:

 Meteuthria futilis (Watson, 1882)
 Meteuthria multituberculata Dell, 1990

References

Buccinidae